Kristic may refer to:

 Kristić
 Krištić